This list of the tallest buildings and structures in Belfast ranks buildings and structures in Belfast, Northern Ireland by height.

Tallest by category

It is the tallest building in Northern Ireland and the island of Ireland.
The tallest structure in Belfast is the Black Mountain Tv mast at 228.6 metres (750 ft).
The tallest free standing and occupied structure is the Harland and Wolf shipbuilding gantry crane Samson at 106 metres (348 ft).
The tallest chimney is the Belfast City Hospital chimney at 95 metres (312 ft).
The tallest church is Belfast (St. Anne's) Cathedral at 80 metres (262 ft).
The tallest clock is the Albert Memorial Clock at 34.4m (113 feet).

Belfast's tallest structures 
These lists rank the 8 tallest structures in Belfast by total height.

Belfast's tallest habitable buildings
This list is the tallest habitable buildings in Belfast by architectural height.

*Note: This building height is incorrectly listed as 62m in both planning applications and in Emporis, but that is the height of the lower roof/arm of building (easy mistake from side elevation) but ignores the last 3 floors, to the upper roof (not a plant), real height is seen in plan documents already cited.

***Recent applications, including the corporation street apartments and queens quay masterplan (see below with citations) have height as 57m not 62m assuming similar error with critical care building, by taking height above sea level as full height (cited in table).

****New children's hospital application reveals original height was only above sea level not base to roof so 63m is height above sea level

***** Height above sea level once again being quoted as height (56m) but base to top it is 52m

Tallest non-habitable buildings 
List of tallest non Habitable buildings over 45m tall in Belfast. Non-Habitable building refers to a building where most of the height is taken up by an architectural feature which is not habitable such as a spire, or storage space.

Tallest demolished 
Tallest buildings and structures in Belfast over 45m to have been demolished.

Potential tall buildings in belfast
Section covers buildings and structures under construction, had planning permission approved and have been proposed for Belfast.

Under construction
This lists buildings that are currently under construction.

Approved 
This lists buildings that have been given planning permission to be constructed  in Belfast.

Proposed 
This lists buildings that have only been proposed to be built in Belfast.

List of Unbuilt Buildings 
Table of tallest proposed buildings that never came to fruition, either due to planning permission or financial issues.

History of Belfast's tallest building

Table of the history of the tallest building in Belfast by Architectural height

See also
List of tallest structures in Ireland
List of tallest buildings and structures in Dublin

References

External links
Skyscraper News: Belfast
  Emporis:Belfast
futurebelfast.com
https://www.planbelfast.com/

Belfast
 
Buildings and structures
Tallest